The FIA Motorsport Games Auto Slalom Cup was the first FIA Motorsport Games Auto Slalom Cup, to be held at Circuit Paul Ricard, France on 26 October to 30 October 2022. The race will contest with identical electric-powered Opel Corsa-e Rally cars. The event was the part of the 2022 FIA Motorsport Games.

Drivers raced around the cones, receiving penalty seconds for every cone knocked off.

Entry List
All entered drivers will compete with identical electric-powered Opel Corsa-e Rally cars.

Results

Classification S1 & S2
      Proceeds to the Round of 16
      Eliminated

Knock-out stages and final

Overall Ranking
      Won the Final
      Lost the Final
      Won the Small Final
      Lost the Small Final
      Eliminated in the Quarterfinals
      Eliminated in the Round of 16
      Eliminated in the Qualifiers

References

External links

Auto Slalom